Francis Fane, 1st Earl of Westmorland (1 February 158023 March 1629),  (styled Sir Francis Fane between 1603 and 1624) of Mereworth in Kent and of Apethorpe in Northamptonshire was an English landowner and politician who sat in the House of Commons between 1601 and 1624 and then was raised to the Peerage as Earl of Westmorland.

Origins
He was the eldest surviving son and heir of Sir Thomas Fane (died 1589) of Badsell in the parish of Tudeley in Kent, by his second wife Mary Neville, suo jure Baroness le Despenser (c. 1554–1626), heiress of Mereworth in Kent, sole daughter and heiress of Henry Nevill, 6th Baron Bergavenny (died 1587) (a descendant of Ralph Neville, 1st Earl of Westmorland (c.1364-1425)) by his wife, Lady Frances Manners, 3rd daughter of Thomas Manners, 1st Earl of Rutland.

The earliest proven recorded ancestor of the Fane family of Kent is "Henry a Vane" (d. 1456/57) of Tonbridge, Kent, thrice-great-grandfather of Francis Fane, 1st Earl of Westmorland. According to The Complete Peerage "the long line of Welsh descent, as given in the Heraldic Visitation of Kent 1574, is spurious". His younger brother was George Fane of Burston.

Career

Fane was educated at Maidstone Grammar School in Kent and in about 1595 matriculated at Queens' College, Cambridge. He was admitted to Lincoln's Inn on 19 November 1597, for training as a lawyer.

In 1601, with the support of his near neighbour Henry Brooke, 11th Baron Cobham, lord of the Manor of Cobham, Kent, Fane was returned as a Member of Parliament for Kent. He was created a Knight of the Bath at the Coronation of King James I on 25 July 1603. 

After Cobham's disgrace, Fane was elected as a Member of Parliament for Maidstone in 1604. He was re-elected MP for Maidstone in 1614 and in 1621. In 1624, he was elected MP for Peterborough, Northamptonshire, near his wife's home at Apethorpe. On 29 December 1624, he was created Baron Burghersh "in the County of Sussex", and Earl of Westmorland (1008th on the roll). On his mother's death on 28 June 1626, he succeeded her as 4th Baron le Despenser, and as de jure 8th and 6th Baron Bergavenny.

Marriage and children

On 15 February 1598/99 Fane married Mary Mildmay (died 9 April 1640), daughter and eventual sole heiress of  Sir Anthony Mildmay (d. 1617), of Apethorpe Hall near the City of Peterborough in Northamptonshire, British Ambassador to France, by his wife Grace Sherington (1552–1620) a daughter and co-heiress of Sir Henry Sherington (alias Sharington) (c. 1518–1581) of Lacock Abbey in Wiltshire. By Mary Mildmay he had seven sons (six of whom survived him) and six daughters:

Sons
Mildmay Fane, 2nd Earl of Westmorland (24 January 160212 February 1666), a poet and Member of Parliament.
Thomas Fane, died in infancy
Sir Francis Fane  (c. 1611–1681?) of Fulbeck, third but second surviving son. He was a Royalist governor of Doncaster, and afterwards of Lincoln Castle. He was the great-grandfather of Thomas Fane, 8th Earl of Westmorland.
Anthony Fane (1613–1643), a colonel in the Parliamentary army, who suffered a shot wound to the cheek at the siege of Farnham Castle on 9 December 1642 and died at his home in Kingston upon Thames early the following year. He married Amabel Benn who after his death married Henry Grey, 10th Earl of Kent.
Col. George Fane (c. 1616April 1663), fifth but fourth surviving son. A Royalist officer and later Member of Parliament.
William Fane
Robert Fane

Daughters
Grace Fane (died 1633), who married James Home, 2nd Earl of Home; 
Mary Fane (1606–1634), who after 18 May 1625 married Dutton Gerard, 3rd Baron Gerard (1613–1640), grandson of Thomas Gerard, 1st Baron Gerard;
Elizabeth Fane, who married firstly Sir John Cope, 3rd Baronet, secondly William Cope, by whom she was a grandmother of Sir John Cope;
Rachel Fane (1614–1681), wife of Henry Bourchier, 5th Earl of Bath (1593–1654), of Tawstock Court, Devon. The marriage was childless, whereupon the earldom became extinct. Her lifesize marble statue survives in Tawstock Church. 
Catherine Fane, who married Conyers Darcy, 2nd Earl of Holderness as his first wife.

Death and burial
Westmorland was buried at Apethorpe on 17 April 1629. A monumental inscription survives in Mereworth Church near Badsell. He was survived by his wife Mary Mildmay, who died at Stevenage and was buried at Apethorpe, and many children.

References

Literature

Some ancestors

 

1580 births
1629 deaths
16th-century English people
17th-century English nobility
Alumni of Queens' College, Cambridge
English landowners
Knights of the Bath
Members of Lincoln's Inn
People educated at Maidstone Grammar School
Francis
Fane, Francis
English MPs 1604–1611
English MPs 1614
English MPs 1621–1622
English MPs 1624–1625
Earls of Westmorland
Barons le Despencer
Barons Burghersh